Fruges is a commune in the Pas-de-Calais department in the Hauts-de-France region of France.

Geography
Situated some 12 miles (19 km) northeast of Montreuil-sur-Mer on the D928 road,  set in a valley not far from the historic battlefield of Azincourt.

Features
Fruges is a typical small country town in the Pas-de-Calais with a weekly market, agricultural suppliers, a Carrefour and various smaller stores.

An annual Fête des Géants livens up August with parades of marching bands and papier mache giants.

Population

Places of interest
 Church of St. Bertulphe, dating from the nineteenth century.

Twin towns
Fruges is twinned with Olsberg, Germany, since 1965.

See also
Communes of the Pas-de-Calais department

References

Communes of Pas-de-Calais
Artois